Sound is an independent Filipino jazz band composed of Dru Ubaldo (drums), Erwin Fajardo (keyboards), Sach Castillo (vocals/guitars), and Francis Magat (bass).

History 

In 1996, Paolo Lim, Chino Yuson, and Sach Castillo formed the band Third Stone, an allusion to a Hendrix grind. Later, the trio collaborated with percussionist David Esteban and keyboardist James Bitanga. Originally, the band intended to be a reggae outfit, but several compositions later, the group went into a different direction. In 1999, the band met Erwin Fajardo, to become the new keyboardist. Together with Castillo, the two started writing songs. By 2001, the band had enough material for an album, and eventually settled for the band name Sound.

Live shows and albums 

Sound's live shows are Manila-themed, influenced by groups ranging from The Beatles, Corduroy, Jamiroquai, Stevie Wonder, and Steely Dan, all flavored with a love for original Filipino music. Sound are regular performers at Café Saguijo (Makati), Magnet, Bonifacio High Street (Fort Bonifacio) and Big Sky Mind (New Manila).

In 2003, the independently released debut BossaManila came out in the local market. Three years later, they released their sophomore effort Blue Monsoon which was notable for the inclusion of the APO Hiking Society original "'Di Na Natuto". The track was also released in the Kami nAPO Muna tribute album, released the same year.

Discography

Studio albums

Compilation albums

References 
 http://www.clickthecity.com/music/sound/
 http://www.jazzsociety.ph/html/sanctum.html

Filipino rock music groups
Filipino jazz ensembles
1999 establishments in the Philippines
Musical groups established in 1999